Mike "Twin" Sullivan (September 23, 1878 – October 31, 1937) was an American boxer credited with taking the Welterweight Championship of the World on April 23, 1907 when he soundly defeated William "Honey" Mellody in Los Angeles in a twenty-round bout.  He vacated the title in the late fall of 1908, when he could not make weight.

He had an impressive knockout percentage and record and fought some of the greatest boxers of his era including Joe Gans, while he was the reigning lightweight champion, as well as welterweight champion Harry Lewis, and leading welterweight contenders Jimmy Clabby, and Jimmy Gardner whom he defeated.

Early career
Mike "Twin" Sullivan was born in Cambridge, Massachusetts on September 23, 1878, and resided in neighboring Boston for much of his career.  He had a twin brother Jack, the origin of his nickname, "twin", and was the youngest in an Irish family of several siblings. His twin Jack was an accomplished middleweight boxer as well, once claiming the Middleweight Championship of the World when he defeated Tommy Burns on March 7, 1905. Jack fought top talent as did Mike, and they shared a few of the same opponents.  His brother Dan was a less well known boxer.

The "Twin" began his career around March 25, 1901, by defeating Jack Dwyer in Boston, Massachusetts in ten rounds. The following month he beat Belfield Wallcott, brother of Joe, at the same Business Man's Athletic Club in Boston in another ten-round bout.

Sullivan had three historic bouts with Hall of Famer and reigning lightweight champion Joe Gans, in September 1905 and January and March 1906 with the first in Maryland and the last two in San Francisco and Los Angeles.  Significantly, Sullivan lost the last two bouts to the lightweight champion by knockout and technical knockout, though their first bout was a close draw.  In the San Francisco fight, Sullivan's first sanctioned Welterweight World Title match according to BoxRec, Gans won by knockout in the fifteenth of twenty rounds.  In an important note, the Rock Island Argus wrote of the San Francisco fight, "Gans showed wonderful form and was easily the master of his white antagonist at all times." It did allow that the first three  rounds were fairly even fighting. After his fights with Gans, Sullivan met Rube Smith, an accomplished welterweight contender three times in April, July, and August 1906 in Colorado, winning in an eighteenth round knockout in April, but drawing in the other two matches.

Sullivan lost to future welterweight Harry Lewis on February 21, 1907 in a ten-round points decision in Denver.  Lewis would use this victory and his subsequent knockout of Honey Mellody one year later on April 20, 1908 to establish what most boxing historians consider a legitimate claim to the World Welterweight Title.  Many boxing sanctioning organization today simply fail to list World Welterweight champions prior to 1910 or 1915, as most of these organizations did not exist during that period, and there was less widespread recognition of world champions.

Winning the Welterweight World Title

Sullivan met Honey Mellody, probably in his most historic bout, on April 23, 1907 in a Welterweight World Title match in Naud Junction Pavilion in Los Angeles.  He won the twenty round bout refereed by Charles Ayton.  The Shreveport Caucasian wrote of the bout, "At all stages Sullivan showed unmistakable superiority and out generated Mellody in infighting.  Mellody's tactics were confined to rushes generally ending in clinches where Sullivan used right upper cuts and short hand jabs to the face with telling effect".   The Washington Evening Star noted that "during the early rounds Mellody had an even break with his clever opponent", but "Sullivan came back strong and from the twelfth had it all his own way." "The "Twin" was immediately recognized as a World Champion in the state of California, and has since been recognized widely by American boxing historians including widely recognized authority Nat Fleischer and a host of newspapers. Sullivan relinquished the title around October or November 1908 according to BoxRec as he was above the welterweight limit.

Boxing two leading welterweight contenders
He fought Jimmy Gardner , a welterweight contender at least four times. Gardner was another welterweight during the period who attempted to claim the world title as his own. They met on December 18, 1902 and January 27, 1903, with one fifteen round draw, and one five round newspaper win. On November 24, 1905, he beat Gardner on points in 20 rounds in San Francisco. He beat Gardner again in what was deemed a Welterweight Title match on April 22, 1908 in a twenty five round points decision at Jeffries Arena in Vernon, California, with the legendary heavyweight ex-champion Jim Jeffries as referee.  Sullivan fought Gardner again on November 29, 1909 at the Grand Opera House in New Haven, Connecticut, in a twelve round draw by newspaper decision of the Boston Globe.

Sullivan fought Jimmy Clabby on February 4, 1910 at the National Athletic Club in Milwaukee, Wisconsin in a ten round draw by newspaper decision. According to the Calumet News, Sullivan was ten pounds heavier than Clabby, demonstrating that Sullivan was fighting above the Welterweight limit, and according to BoxRec had been fighting above the Welterweight limit since around December 1908.  Clabby was a serious contender for the Welterweight Championship himself, and one of several boxers who believed he had a claim to it in later years, though his claim was never widely recognized.  Sullivan fought Clabby again on June 3, 1911, in Buffalo, in a close ten round bout that the Buffalo Times, wrote Clabby had a "slight shade," implying he won by a small margin.

World Middleweight Title bout with Stanley Ketchel

Fighting as a light middleweight at 150 pounds, he lost a Middleweight Title Bout against reigning Middleweight Champion Stanley Ketchel by first round knockout, on February 22, 1908 at Mission Street Arena in Colma, California. It was rare for Sullivan to lose by knockout, and made the bout more memorable for supporters of Ketchel.  Some boxing critics believe that Sullivan's career began a slow descent after this loss.

On September 1, 1910, Sullivan fought a bout with contender Paddy Lavin, which resulted in a draw.  There was an edge by Sullivan in the ten round bout in Buffalo, New York, according to the Los Angeles Herald of September 3. Sullivan showed his power, knocking Lavin to the canvas for a count of eight in the first round. The two fought another ten round bout at the same location on October 6, with the Buffalo Times giving their decision for both fights to Sullivan.

Official Professional boxing record

All Newspaper decisions are regarded as “no decision” bouts as they have “resulted in neither boxer winning or losing, and would therefore not count as part of their official fight record."

Unofficial Professional boxing record

Record with the inclusion of Newspaper decisions to the win/loss/draw column.

See also
Lineal championship
List of welterweight boxing champions

References

|-

External links
 

1878 births
1937 deaths
Sportspeople from Cambridge, Massachusetts
Boxers from Massachusetts
World boxing champions
World welterweight boxing champions
Welterweight boxers
American male boxers